The 52nd United States Colored Infantry was an infantry regiment that served in the Union Army during the American Civil War. The regiment was composed of African American enlisted men commanded by white officers and was authorized by the Bureau of Colored Troops which was created by the United States War Department on May 22, 1863.

Service
The 52nd U.S. Colored Infantry was organized from the 2nd Mississippi Infantry (African Descent) on March 11, 1864 for three-year service.

The regiment was attached to 2nd Brigade, 1st Division, United States Colored Troops, District of Vicksburg, Mississippi, to October 1864. 2nd Brigade, 4th Division, XVI Corps, to November 1864. 2nd Brigade, 1st Division, United States Colored Troops, District of Vicksburg, Mississippi, to February 1865. Maltby's Brigade, District of Vicksburg, Mississippi, and Department of Mississippi, to May 1866.

The 52nd U.S. Colored Infantry mustered out of service May 5, 1866.

Detailed service
Post and garrison duty at Vicksburg, Mississippi, until June 1865. Action at Coleman's Plantation, Port Gibson, July 4, 1864. Bayou Liddell October 15. Duty at various points in the Department of Mississippi and the Department of the Gulf until May 1866.

See also

List of United States Colored Troops Civil War Units
United States Colored Troops
List of Mississippi Union Civil War units

References
 Dyer, Frederick H. A Compendium of the War of the Rebellion (Des Moines, IA: Dyer Pub. Co.), 1908.
Attribution

United States Colored Troops Civil War units and formations
Military units and formations established in 1864
Military units and formations disestablished in 1866
1864 establishments in Mississippi
1866 disestablishments in Mississippi